Spicauda procne, the brown longtail, is a species of butterfly in the family Hesperiidae. It is found from Argentina, north through Central America and Mexico to southern Texas. Rare strays can be found up to southern New Mexico, southern Arizona and southern California.

The wingspan is 37–48 mm. There are three generations per year in southern Texas.

The larvae feed on various grasses, including Cynodon dactylon and Sorghum halepense.

External links
Urbanus procne , Butterflies and Moths of North America

Eudaminae
Butterflies of North America
Butterflies of Central America
Hesperiidae of South America
Butterflies of Trinidad and Tobago
Lepidoptera of Brazil
Lepidoptera of Colombia
Lepidoptera of Ecuador
Lepidoptera of Venezuela
Fauna of the Amazon
Butterflies described in 1880